The 1998 Texas gubernatorial election was held on November 3, 1998, to elect the governor of Texas. Incumbent Republican Governor George W. Bush was re-elected in a landslide over 4-term Democratic Texas Land Commissioner Garry Mauro, winning 68% of the vote to Mauro's 31%. Bush carried 239 counties, while Mauro carried just 15. Exit polls revealed that Bush won 27% of the African-American vote, which was the highest percentage for any Republican statewide candidate, and 49% of the Latino vote. Bush was sworn in for a second term as Governor on January 19, 1999.

As of 2023, this is the most recent gubernatorial election in which El Paso County and Travis County voted for the Republican candidate, with the latter giving Bush over 60%, a rarity for Republicans in that county given its status as a liberal stronghold. This was the first election in which Republicans won consecutive gubernatorial elections in the state. Bush's 37-point margin of victory was the largest won by any candidate since 1966 and is, to date, the largest ever won by a Republican candidate.

Background
George W. Bush, the son of former President of the United States George H. W. Bush, was elected governor in 1994, defeating incumbent Democratic Governor Ann Richards. Upon taking office in January 1995, Bush had a low approval rating of 38%. Over the course of his first term, this increased significantly, reaching 70% in February 1997. Going into the election, Bush had an approval rating of 76%.

Primaries

Republican

Democratic

Campaign

Throughout the entire campaign, George W. Bush led in the polls by wide margins. After Garry Mauro declared his candidacy in November 1997, a Scripps Howard Texas Poll of 793 registered voters showed Bush leading by 68%–16%, with 14% undecided. George Bush spokeswoman Karen Hughes said, "The philosophical differences between Gov. Bush and Garry Mauro are clear and stark. Gov. Bush is a conservative, as most Texans are, and Garry Mauro is a liberal." In mid-June 1998, a Scripps Howard Texas Poll was conducted with Bush versus Mauro. The poll showed 70% likely voters support Bush, 17% favored Mauro, 11% were undecided, and 2% would vote for neither. Bush's approval rating was also virtually unchanged polling at 75%. In response to the poll, government professor Bruce Buchanan at the University of Texas at Austin said, "Gov. Bush looks to be unbeatable, but there's enough time for anything to happen. There is a slim chance for Mauro but still a real chance for him to reach voters with ad dollars and issue choices. It's just too early to call the November election in June."

On June 22, 1998, Mauro called Bush out of touch saying, "Governor Bush is out of touch with the concerns of ordinary citizens and in bed with the giant HMO's." This was because in 1995, Bush vetoed the Patient Protection Act, which would have forced state-regulated healthcare organizations to allow their customers to choose their own doctor. The Patient Protection Act would have also mandated that insurance companies to cover cancer treatment received at the University of Texas MD Anderson Cancer Center.

Another Scripps Howard Texas Poll was conducted from August 12 to August 27, 1998. It indicated that 77% of likely voters support Bush, 20% favored Mauro, and 1% supported Libertarian candidate Lester Turlington Jr. About 10% were undecided and 2% didn't answer. Again, Bush's approval rating barely fell and was 74% of Texans remarked that he was doing a good to excellent job as governor. Allan Saxe, an assistant political science professor at the University of Texas said, "Now he's ahead [Bush] by an awfully huge margin. If Garry Mauro can close that to a 10 to 15 percent difference by election day, it will be a symbolic victory. But it will be hard to do – a 50-point difference is a big one." Among Hispanics, Bush led Mauro 51%–31%, down from 67%–20% in June.

Bush and Mauro met for the sole gubernatorial election debate in El Paso on October 16, 1998. Initially, Bush seemed rather nervous and defensive. Mauro attacked Bush for his position on teachers salaries and support for a nuclear waste dump in Sierra Blanca. However, Bush was well prepared and attacked Mauro's tax and spending proposals, describing them as "overambitious". The results of the debate would have little impact on the general election in November.

Results

Aftermath
Following his defeat, Garry Mauro was succeeded by David Dewhurst as the Commissioner of the General Land Office in early 1999. Mauro would later serve as the Texas State Chairman for various Democratic presidential candidates, including for Al Gore in 2000, Dick Gephardt in 2004, and Hillary Clinton in 2008. However, Mauro himself never sought political office again. Eventually, he opened a private law practice in his hometown of Austin.

George W. Bush was inaugurated for his second term as Governor of Texas on January 19, 1999. With his brother Jeb sworn-in as Governor of Florida earlier that month, George and Jeb Bush became the first two brothers to simultaneously serve as governors since Nelson and Winthrop Rockefeller from 1967 to 1971. Five months later, in June 1999, Bush announced his candidacy for President of the United States in 2000. At the 2000 Republican National Convention, Bush was nominated for President of the United States and narrowly won the election against Al Gore. On December 21, 2000, less than two years into his second term, George W. Bush resigned as Governor of Texas and was succeeded by Rick Perry.

Notes

References

Gubernatorial
1998
Texas
George W. Bush